The Division 2 season 1995/1996, organised by the LFP was won by SM Caen and saw the promotions of SM Caen, Olympique de Marseille and AS Nancy, whereas Stade Poitevin, USL Dunkerque, Angers SCO and Olympique Alès were relegated to National.

22 participating teams

 Alès
 Amiens
 Angers
 Caen
 Charleville
 Châteauroux
 Dunkerque
 Épinal
 Laval
 Le Mans
 Lorient
 Louhans-Cuiseaux
 Marseille
 Mulhouse
 Nancy
 Niort
 Perpignan
 Poitiers
 Red Star
 Sochaux
 Toulouse
 Valence

League table

Recap
 Promoted to L1 : SM Caen, Olympique de Marseille, AS Nancy
 Relegated to L2 : FC Gueugnon, AS Saint-Étienne, FC Martigues
 Promoted to L2 : Stade Briochin, Troyes AC, Sporting Toulon Var, AS Beauvais
 Relegated to National : Stade Poitevin, USL Dunkerque, Angers SCO, Olympique Alès

Results

Top goalscorers

External links
RSSSF archives of results

Ligue 2 seasons
French
2